Mandarin Restaurant Franchise Corporation is a chain of all-you-can-eat Chinese-Canadian buffet restaurants. It was founded in 1979 and currently has its headquarters in Brampton, Ontario. The chain consists of licensed restaurants across Southern Ontario offering over 100 Chinese-Canadian buffet menu items, take-out, and delivery, as well as à-la-carte ordering. Each restaurant location employs about 100 people, making Mandarin an employer for approximately over 2,500 people.

History

Mandarin was founded by James Chiu, George Chiu, K. C. Chang, and Diana Chiu, all of whom had many years of restaurant experience in Montreal and New York City. Together, they moved to Ontario, Canada in 1979 and purchased a small restaurant with Chinese-Canadian décor on Queen Street in Brampton, Ontario, naming it "Mandarin".

At the time of purchase, Mandarin operated only as a small à-la-carte restaurant. The restaurant was later increased to three times its original size.

In 1987, Mandarin began to franchise by allowing its existing employees to become franchise partners. To become a franchisee, a candidate must have worked for at least one year at one of the company's restaurants and graduated from the Management Apprenticeship Program at the corporate headquarters.

As part of their 35th anniversary, Mandarin invited all Canadian citizens to a free buffet meal at any of their locations on Canada Day, July 1, 2014; this was repeated for their 40th anniversary on July 1, 2019.

Due to the COVID-19 pandemic in 2020, reopened Mandarin locations changed to an à la carte approach similar to dim sum.

Community involvement

Over the years, Mandarin has involved itself with various health care organizations and charitable groups in the community. Some of these include:

Mandarin became a major partner of the Multiple Sclerosis (MS) Society in 2013. As a result, the MS Walk was renamed in Ontario as the Mandarin MS Walk.  As of 2019, there are over 50 Mandarin MS Walks across Ontario which have raised over 1 million in support of research and community support.  Also in 2013, Mandarin became a major sponsor of the Giant Pandas and the Giant Panda Conservation Breeding Program at the Toronto Zoo. In addition to sponsoring this for a 5-year term, the first-ever Mandarin Express kiosk was opened, offering selected Mandarin dishes served to zoo guests.

Mandarin is also a community leader in promoting the values of education through its Mandarin Scholarship program which directly supports post-secondary students across Ontario. These schools include:
George Brown College,
Humber College, 
Niagara College,
Ryerson University,
University of Guelph,
Algonquin College,
Fanshawe College,
Georgian College,
Seneca College.

Mandarin was featured in Season 04 Episode 06 of Undercover Boss Canada on October 24, 2013.

The company committed a pledge payment of $1 million in 2007 supporting the Schulich Heart Centre capital expansion at Sunnybrook Health Sciences Centre.

See also
List of Chinese restaurants
List of Canadian restaurant chains

References

External links

Chinese restaurants outside China
Restaurant chains in Canada
Restaurants in Ontario
Companies based in Brampton
Chinese-Canadian culture in Ontario
Restaurants established in 1979
1979 establishments in Ontario